Shawn Spencer is a fictional character and main protagonist on the American television comedy-drama Psych played by American actor James Roday Rodriguez. Taking advantage of his eidetic memory and keen observational skills, he poses as a psychic and works as a private detective who often consults with the Santa Barbara Police Department.

Fictional biography
Shawn Spencer works as a freelance consultant to the Santa Barbara Police Department, along with his business partner and lifelong best friend Burton Guster. Shawn is hyper-observant, has an eidetic memory, and always ends up being in the right place at the right time. This makes him an excellent detective; however, his impulsiveness, fear of commitment, and lack of follow-through prevented him from achieving a traditional career with the police. Therefore, he fakes having psychic powers that the police believe aid him in solving crimes; he is in fact simply using his natural detection skills.

Shawn was a breech birth, born on March 24 1977, and comes from a family of police officers. His father, Henry, is a decorated sergeant who trained Shawn from childhood to be hyper-observant. His parents separated in 1992, and later divorced; his mother, Madeleine (a psychologist), eventually returned and explained that she left to pursue a job opportunity.  At the age of 15, he achieved a perfect score of 100 on the detective's exam. This is drawn loosely from the childhood of series creator Steve Franks, who was also born into a family of police officers and whose father "was training [Franks] in his own way to follow his footsteps."  Franks' father would ask him how many people were wearing hats in a restaurant, a tactic Henry employs in the series pilot.

Shawn's relationship with his father is complicated; Henry is disappointed that Shawn did not follow in his footsteps as a police officer, and is skeptical of Shawn's detective business. Though often it may seem that Henry is intentionally aggravating or imposing his will on his grown son, however, it is frequently implied that he genuinely loves Shawn and wants him to be happy and successful. For example, Henry tips off a meter maid to ticket Shawn's motorcycle, which is parked too close to a hydrant outside his apartment. Shawn's motorcycle is impounded as a result, which was Henry's ultimate goal, as it is later revealed that Shawn had gotten into a serious accident some time ago. When push comes to shove, Henry is always there to back Shawn up, whether it be providing advice on a case Shawn is stuck on or tracking down Shawn's kidnappers (both of which occur in multiple episodes), Henry is there. For years, Shawn blamed his father for leaving his mother and ending their marriage but in the third season opener, his mother reveals that she was the one who left Henry. Shawn thus realizes his father lied to him because he didn't want to ruin the image Shawn had of his mother and sees Henry in a new light.

Despite his obvious talent, Shawn has no interest in entering the police force, and after graduating from Leland Bosseigh High School in Santa Barbara, California, in 1995, takes up a string of random, low-responsibility jobs. He is shown to be a crack shot, hitting all of Detective Barry's bullet holes in a target with little experience and, at a later episode, disabling a suspect's truck during a chase while he was hanging from the hood of Lassiter's car.(Season 4 Episode 9) In his spare time, he entertains himself by calling in tips to the police hotline based on observations he has made on crime scenes shown in television news footage. After one such tip, the Santa Barbara police become suspicious of Shawn, whose information is so good that they believe it could only have come from an inside source. Desperate to avoid jail time, Shawn lies, explaining that he obtained the information in a psychic vision. Although initially skeptical, the department is impressed when he uses his "psychic" abilities to deduce that McNab was engaged to be married, that the secretary was "haunted" by her dead grandmother, that Lassiter was in a relationship with his partner (who only appears in the pilot episode and is immediately replaced in the next episode by his current partner, Juliet), and to solve a vandalism case. They hire Shawn as a consultant. Gus reluctantly allows Shawn to recruit him, and they open their own psychic detective agency, "Psych".

Characterization
Although Shawn and Gus often have disagreements, they have been friends since early childhood and actor James Roday Rodriguez describes the pair's bond as "unbreakable". "It's one of those friendships that make people who don't have one ask, 'Why does Gus put up with Shawn?' It's not about putting up with one another. It's about knowing each other so well that things that might annoy someone from the outside don't annoy you anymore." Shawn knows exactly how to manipulate Gus, and often frustrates his friend with his antics, but has come to rely on him more in their casework as the series has progressed. Roday Rodriguez believes that Shawn has "evolved a lot" as a partner, moving away from "dragging Gus around by the collar against his will from case to case to case" toward a more equal partnership.  He states that under Gus's influence, Shawn has "wisened up a little bit" and is learning to display a little more discretion.

Shawn's growing maturity is especially notable in Season 3, Episode 16 "An Evening with Mr. Yang" the first of what would become a running plot concerning a serial killer who individually targets Shawn. To convince Shawn to play his game, Mr. Yang (who actually turns out to be female) kidnaps Shawn's mother. Shawn has trouble coping with the pressure of finding his mother and is unable to make any progress on the case. He opens up to Gus and viewers can witness a more mature version of Shawn rising to the situation. Shawn tells Gus that he needs his help, showing humility and maturity, and for the rest of the episode Gus, the normally calm one, becomes the crazy one so that Shawn can focus on the task at hand. At the end of the episode, after Shawn's mother has been found and Yang arrested, Juliet approaches Shawn informing him of how impressed she was by his maturity and says that she would like to go on a date with him. Shawn has been constantly hitting on Juliet for the past 3 seasons and every time she has refused to return his attentions. Shawn had at this point rather given up on Juliet and has moved on to Abigail, his high school sweetheart whom he is currently on a date with. Juliet says she understands, gives him a loving kiss on the cheek, and walks away. But after Abigail breaks up with him, saying she does not want to live a life of danger, he starts hitting on Juliet again, eventually falling in love with her.

Shawn's seemingly random stream of consciousness often belies the far-reaching logical connections that his observational skills allow him to make. He explains the multiple-personality-afflicted Robert Dunn's condition to Gus by referencing The Flying Nun, which starred Sally Field, who played the similarly-affected title character in Sybil. He also hybridizes movie quotes voiced by James Earl Jones in two separate films (The Lion King and The Empire Strikes Back) when addressing a mountain lion: "Simba, I am your father." Running jokes on the show center around Shawn's love of Jerk Chicken and pineapples (even though he has a "distaste" for pointy objects), which he will often bring as a gift to people he is meeting for the first time; his frequent desire for Kit Kat bars, his inability to set his cell phone to vibrate, even when spying or infiltrating the homes of suspects; his fondness for Val Kilmer; his love of Curt Smith and Tears for Fears; his comments on other people's hair; his difficulty in pronouncing certain words (such as "chassis"); mispronouncing or misquoting phrases (e.g. "Harry Potter and the Prisoner of Marzipan", "Abercrombie and Fletch") and after being corrected, claiming "I've heard it both ways"; his use of other people's property in his psychic "visions" (i.e. using O'Hara's scarf to cover his eyes, ripping out the paper tray of the printer belonging to Chief Vick, Gus's head); and, of course, the pseudonyms he makes up for Gus each time he questions a person of interest, often a reference to an obscure '80s movie, a combination of two or more celebrities' names, or something he created on the spot.

Shawn was introduced in the serial killer Mr. Yang's book on page 11. He is described as "a thick-tufted boy genius who ice skates through life on polished blades of snarky eloquence." Shawn is friends with the Santa Barbara Coroner, given they share a similar sense of humor. Shawn bribes the coroner with gifts in exchange for information on cases Shawn has not been officially hired to take.

Shawn very obviously cares for the victims and wants to see justice. This is clear in every season finale, where he has a personal connection to the victims.

Because Shawn isn't an official detective, he often has to resort to stealing, withholding evidence, obstruction of justice, tampering with evidence and witnesses, breaking and entering, and numerous other crimes to solve a crime. Despite his high intelligence, Shawn does appear to have a poor grasp of history and other fields (assigned to write about a U.S. President, he wrote a paper on the fictional character from the movie "Dave" who he thought was real). He is also chided by Henry for not knowing all the details of a case beforehand (in one episode, Shawn is about to accuse an innocent man of murder before Henry stops him and reveals a detail Shawn would know from the case file he didn't read). Often, Shawn will accept a case without fully checking out the client or the details themselves yet brush it off.

In "Let's Doo-Wop It Again", he said, "It's more fun to keep things from Lassie" [Lassiter], which eventually resulted in Gus's friends getting kidnapped, and in "True Grits", he asked Officer McNab to withhold evidence from Juliet (McNab refused).  He also told Juliet that 'Santa Barbara would be Detroit' if it weren't for him.

References

Fictional private investigators
Fictional characters from Santa Barbara, California
Fictional characters with eidetic memory
Fictional con artists
Fictional consultants
Psych characters
Television characters introduced in 2006
Fictional characters with attention deficit hyperactivity disorder